Jeanny Dom (born 5 February 1954) is a retired Luxembourgian table tennis player.  She is currently the General Secretary of the European Table Tennis Union.  During her career, Dom won the title of Luxembourgian Sportswoman of the Year a record seven times, which is also more than the record six times Marc Girardelli won the title of Luxembourgian Sportsman of the Year.

References

External links
 ITTF DATABASE

Luxembourgian female table tennis players
Living people
1954 births